Laura Margolis (born July 16, 1973) is an American actress. She has performed in guest roles on television for such series as The Drew Carey Show, Friends, Line of Fire, Monk, and Mistresses.

Early life 
Margolis was born in Chicago, Illinois.

Career
Margolise played the part of Marcy in Alistair Legrand's 2015 horror film, The Diabolical. She also had a recurring role as Daisy in the series Dirty Sexy Money. Her film career consists mainly of roles in short films, but her first mainstream role was in the 2008 horror film The Strangers as the masked villain "Pin-Up Girl".

Margolis also appeared in the 2018 film Higher Power.

Filmography

Film

Television

References

External links
 

1973 births
Living people
Actresses from Chicago
21st-century American actresses